The rufous-vented paradise flycatcher (Terpsiphone rufocinerea) is a species of bird in the family Monarchidae. It is 
found from southern Cameroon to eastern and central Democratic Republic of the Congo and north-western Angola. This species readily hybridizes with the genetically similar African paradise flycatcher.
Its natural habitats are subtropical or tropical swamps and shrub-dominated wetlands.

References

rufous-vented paradise flycatcher
Birds of Central Africa
rufous-vented paradise flycatcher
Taxonomy articles created by Polbot